Indrevevring (also known as Vevring) is a village in Sunnfjord Municipality in Vestland county, Norway. The village of Kvammen (in Askvoll Municipality) lies directly south, across the fjord. The village of Indrevevring had a population (2001) of 143 residents.

Indrevevring is the site of Vevring Church.  It was the administrative centre of the old municipality of Vevring which existed from 1838 until 1964.

References

Villages in Vestland
Sunnfjord